Moldova competed at the 2014 Winter Olympics in Sochi, Russia, from 7 to 23 February 2014. Moldova's team consists of four athletes in four sports.

Moldovan President Nicolae Timofti did not attend the 2014 Winter Olympics. He has not said publicly that the decision was a political gesture.

Alpine skiing 

According to the quota allocation released on 20 January 2014, Moldova had two athletes in qualification position. However naturalized Italian alpine skier Mirko Deflorian withdrew from the team citing poor results.

Biathlon  

Pending reallocation of quotas, will allow Moldova to enter one female athlete. Alexandra Camenscic also competed in cross-country skiing.

Cross-country skiing 

According to the quota allocation released on 20 January 2014, Moldova had two athletes in qualification position. The team was officially named on 22 January 2014.

Distance

Sprint

Luge 

Moldova qualified a place in the men's singles when Bogdan Macovei finished in the top 38 (with a maximum of three per nation qualifying) during the 2013–14 Luge World Cup. The team was officially named on 22 January 2014.

References

External links 
Moldova at the 2014 Winter Olympics

Nations at the 2014 Winter Olympics
2014 Winter Olympics
Olympics